Infanta Margarita of Spain, Duchess of Soria, 2nd Duchess of Hernani, Grandee of Spain (Margarita María de la Victoria Esperanza Jacoba Felicidad Perpetua de Todos los Santos de Borbón y Borbón; born 6 March 1939), is the younger sister of King Juan Carlos and aunt of the reigning King Felipe VI of Spain.

Early life
Infanta Margarita was born at Hotel NH Firenze Anglo American in Rome as the younger daughter of Infante Juan, Count of Barcelona, and Princess Mercedes of the Two Sicilies. Margarita has been blind since birth.

Marriage
She married the physician Carlos Zurita y Delgado on 12 October 1972 in Estoril at St. Anthony's Church. They have two children:

Don Alfonso Juan Carlos Zurita y de Borbón, Grandee of Spain, born on 9 August 1973 at Virgen de La Palomain Hospital in Madrid. 
María Sofía Emilia Carmen Zurita y de Borbón, Grandee of Spain, born on 16 September 1975 in Madrid. Queen Sofia of Spain was her godmother. Maria Sofia has a son:
Don Carlos Alfonso Juan Zurita y de Borbón, born on 28 April 2018 in Madrid.

Activities
In 1989, alongside her husband, they created the Fundación Cultural Duques de Soria (The Duke and Duchess of Soria Cultural Foundation). She's also Honorary President of Madrid's delegation of UNICEF and of the Spanish Heart Foundation.

Succession and Grandeeship
Infanta Margarita renounced her right of succession to the Spanish throne upon marriage.

On 6 January 1979, the Infanta's cousin Manfredo de Borbón, 1st Duke of Hernani, died and willed his ducal title to be inherited by Margarita. The King granted this request, and on 27 May 1981, she became 2nd Duchess of Hernani with accompanying dignity Grandee of Spain. The peerage title refers to the town Hernani, Spain. The month after, on 23 June 1981, she was granted a higher dukedom for life by the king and also became Duchess of Soria (referring to the city Soria in Spain).

Honours

National 
 : Knight Grand Cross of the Order of Charles III
 : 1,192nd Dame Grand Cross of the Order of Queen Maria Luisa
 : Knight Grand Cross of the Order of Alfonso X

Foreign 
  Greek Royal Family: Dame Grand Cross of the Order of Saints Olga and Sophia
 
  Two Sicilian Royal Family: Knight Grand Cross of Justice of the Two Sicilian Royal Sacred Military Constantinian Order of Saint George
 : Grand Cross of the Order of Infante Henry

Ancestors

References

1939 births
Living people
House of Bourbon (Spain)
Spanish infantas
Blind royalty and nobility
Spanish blind people
Nobility from Rome
102
101

Grand Crosses of the Order of Prince Henry
Recipients of the Civil Order of Alfonso X, the Wise